The Salentse is a river in Valais, Switzerland, and a right tributary of the Rhône. Its source is at north of the municipality of Leytron, near of the Grand Muveran. It flows to the South to join the Rhône, in the city of Saillon. During the 1840s, an irrigation canal have been dug to irrigate and bring water in Saillon.

References 

Rivers of Valais